Spheres of Justice: A Defense of Pluralism and Equality is a 1983 book by the philosopher Michael Walzer.

Summary

Walzer argues in favour of an idea he calls "complex equality", and against the view that goods with different meaning and content can be lumped together into the larger category of primary goods, as is advocated by John Rawls, in his A Theory of Justice (1971).

Reception
Spheres of Justice has, together with Just and Unjust Wars (1977) and Interpretation and Social Criticism (1987), been identified as one of Walzer's most important works by the philosopher Will Kymlicka.

References

Bibliography

External links
 preview through Google Books (large images)

1983 non-fiction books
Basic Books books
Books by Michael Walzer
Books in political philosophy
English-language books